Prosperity (simplified Chinese: 喜事年年) is a Singaporean Chinese family drama produced by MatrixVision, revolving around the lives of three sisters having their own families. It stars Hong Huifang, Aileen Tan, Priscelia Chan, Terence Cao, Tiffany Leong, Tracy Lee and Andie Chen as the casts of the series. It made its debut on Singapore's free-to-air channel, MediaCorp Channel 8 on 10 January 2011 and ended on 11 February 2011. This drama serial consists of 22 episodes, and was screened on every weekday night at 9.00 pm.

This drama had made its rerun from 29 December 2011 and ended on 31 January 2012, at 5.30p.m.

Cast

Note: There are no nominations for this drama in Star Awards 2012.

Trivia
The Show was Pre empted on 3 & 4 February due to Chinese New Year Special. 
The show was pre tempted on 2 February due to Chinese New Year Countdown. 
 The drama  took over the 3.30pm timeslot

Singapore Chinese dramas
2011 Singaporean television series debuts
2011 Singaporean television series endings
Channel 8 (Singapore) original programming